A plunge dip (also known as a dipping vat, dipping tank or, simply, a dip) is a bath designed to immerse livestock in liquid pesticide or other treatment.

Design
Typically a dip is designed as a narrow channel (about the width of the animal) through which the animals walk, immersing them in progressively deeper liquid until  the animal is completely immersed (apart from its head so it can breathe). The channel then becomes progressively shallower until the animal exits. Because many animals can walk through the channel one after another, it is an efficient method of delivering pesticide or other liquid treatments to a large herd.

A liquid product used to treat the livestock by immersion in a plunge dip is also known as a dip (e.g. sheep dip).

See also 
 R v Korsten
 Cattle drenching

References

External links

Animal husbandry
Pesticides
Bathing
Agricultural buildings